The Supreme People's Procuratorate is the highest national agency responsible for legal prosecution and investigation in the People's Republic of China. Conceived initially in 1949 as the Supreme People's Prosecutor's Office, the agency was renamed the Supreme People's Procuratorate in 1954. The Procuratorate was abolished during the Cultural Revolution, before being re-instated in 1978. Between the 1990s to 2010s, the agency experienced a host of reforms pertaining to its selection of personnel, internal organization and role in the management of corruption.

The primary role of the Supreme People's Procuratorate is to ensure that all state agencies, officers, and citizens of the People's Republic of China abide by the law. The Procuratorate acts as a public prosecutor for criminal cases, conducting both the relevant investigations and prosecutions of such cases, as is typical of inquisitorial systems used in civil law jurisdictions. The agency also reviews the legal rulings of the local and special procuratorates, the lower people's courts, and issues judicial interpretations. Beginning in March 2018, the Supreme People's Procuratorate no longer undertakes the initial investigation of corruption cases by government officials; this task is undertaken by the newly formed National Supervisory Commission. The procurator general reports annually to the National People's Congress. 

The Supreme People's Procuratorate is organized into ten specialized prosecutor's offices, which operate under the direction of a Procuratorial Committee. Led by a Prosecutor-General, the Procuratorate is also composed of several Deputy Prosecutors-General and additional prosecutors. The Prosecutor-General is appointed by the National People's Congress, which also elects the other members of the Supreme People's Procuratorate at the Prosecutor-General's recommendation. The current Prosecutor-General of the People's Republic of China is Ying Yong.

History

Origins 
The most rudimentary version of the Supreme People's Procuratorate was established in September 1949 with the promulgation of the Organic Law of the Central People's Government. Initially titled the “People's Prosecutor-General's Office”, the Supreme People's Procuratorate was the first national agency tasked with the supervision of the law in the newly founded People's Republic of China.

The responsibilities of the initial Procuratorate were formalized in the 1951 Statutes. As described by academics Ginsburgs and Stahnke, the agency's powers encompassed:

 Overseeing the abidance of the law by all individuals, public organizations and state agencies;
 The investigation of individuals who breach the law or state interests;
 The ability to reject judgements made by lower judicial bodies;
 The supervision of legal abidance in the nation-wide prison system;
 The ability to review and reopen cases dropped by lower procuratorates when petitioned;
 Serving as a legal representative for the Party's interests in civil and administrative lawsuits.

Alongside these functions, the Procuratorate was able to prosecute anyone deemed suspicious and warranting investigation and could request information from other state organs to assist with the prosecutorial process. The Procuratorate also had the ability to establish an office in each local government area to supervise and lead the judicial system in the locality. However, the Procuratorate was largely inactive following its inception. This changed in 1953 when investigation departments within the body were created.

Rise and early years 
In 1954, the People's Prosecutor-General's Office was renamed the “Supreme People's Procuratorate” at the first session of the First National People's Congress. The new Procuratorate was formally enacted in the 1954 State Constitution subsequently adopted by the Congress, retaining its legal supervisory role. The jurisdiction of the Procuratorate was established as encompassing all government bodies, public functionaries and citizens of China, except the Central People's Government, which oversaw the agency's operation.

Cultural Revolution 
During the Cultural Revolution of 1966 – 1976, the people's procuratorates lost favor as they were perceived as an interference to the socialist cause of the Chinese Communist Party. Reflecting this sentiment, the Supreme People's Procuratorate was abolished from the 1975 State Constitution alongside all other procuratorates. Following its dissolution, the Procuratorate's powers of legal supervision over the state and individuals were transferred to the police. The Supreme People's Procuratorate was subsequently re-established in 1978 via the reinstatement of the Organic Law of the People's Procuratorates in the 1978 State Constitution. Its renewal served as a mechanism for the Party to oversee and prevent misconduct within the administration.

In 1980, the Supreme People's Procuratorate established a Special Procuratorate to investigate and prosecute the Lin Biao and Jiang Qing "counter-revolutionary cliques." In a trial led by the serving Prosecutor-General Huang Huoqing, the defendants were found guilty of plotting a coup to overthrow the leaders of the Chinese Communist Party during the Cultural Revolution.

Development and reform 
In the 1990s, major reforms were made to the Chinese judicial system, including the people's courts and procuratorates. These changes occurred primarily in response to the economic reform of China as a socialist market economy, a development instigated by Deng Xiaoping's southern tour in 1992. In 1995, the Procurator's Law was introduced to “professionalize the judicial personnel” by raising the stringency of the requirements used to select procurators and other procuratorate personnel. Emphasis was placed on the selection of prosecutors and personnel based on merit, performance and experience in legal practice.

Further reform of the Procuratorate accompanied the adoption of the “Implementing Opinions of the Three-Year Procuratorial Reform” in January 2000. This reform affirmed the hierarchy of the procuratorates and formalised the role of the higher procuratorates supervising and directing procuratorates located beneath them. Alongside the reform, a new training program for procurators was introduced from 2001–2005 to manage workforce performance within the Procuratorate.

In December 2018, major alterations were made to the internal organization of the Supreme People's Procuratorate through the restructuring of existing departments and the establishment of ten new prosecutor's offices. Four of these offices were established to handle the prosecution of various types of criminal cases. The remaining six departments oversee “civil, administrative, public interest and juvenile cases, complaints handling, and investigation into duty crimes committed by judicial personnel," respectively, as reported by Xinhua News Agency, China's official state-run media agency.

In November 2020, the Intellectual Property Prosecution Office of the Supreme People's Procuratorate was established to handle the investigation and prosecution of intellectual property rights infringements.

Anti-corruption enforcement 
In 1979, the Supreme People's Procuratorate began its involvement in the investigation and prosecution of corruption by establishing a specialized department to investigate economic crimes. Further pressure from student activists and Party members alike in the early 1990s led to the people's procuratorates developing more stringent protocols to manage corruption. Anti-corruption enforcement by the Supreme People's Procuratorate's grew in 1995 with the introduction of three new departments to manage corruption: the Anti-Corruption and Bribery Bureau, the Corruption Prevention Department, and the Anti-Dereliction of Duty and Infringement of Citizens’ Rights Department. However, the Procuratorate's supervision of corruption was later streamlined by legislation from the National People's Congress in late 2014, which resulted in the amalgamation of the agency's three anti-corruption departments into a single anti-corruption authority.

The management of corruption by the Chinese Communist Party was broadly transformed in 2018. At the March meeting of the 13th National People's Congress, a new anti-corruption agency titled the National Supervisory Commission was formally installed to consolidate the various anti-corruption authorities which existed under the Party, including those of the Procuratorate. The Supreme People's Procuratorate role in anti-corruption enforcement was largely rescinded, with all these responsibilities directly transferred to the new National Supervisory Commission. The Procuratorate's anti-corruption personnel saw a similar transition.

Powers and jurisdiction 

The Supreme People's Procuratorate serves as the highest prosecutorial power in the People's Republic of China, overseeing the nation's local and special procuratorates. As determined by the Organic Law, the primary function of the Procuratorate is to suppress illegal activities, particularly those which undermine the interests of China's ruling party, the Chinese Communist Party.

The jurisdiction of the Procuratorate encompasses all cases related to criminal law, public and state security, people's courts, prisons, detention centers and labour institutions within the People's Republic of China. The agency does not oversee the prosecution of cases from the special administrative regions of Hong Kong or Macau, except those that are investigated by the Office for Safeguarding National Security of the CPG in the HKSAR.

As specified in the Constitution of the People's Republic of China, the Supreme People's Procuratorate nominally exerts its powers independently, without interference from "any administrative organ, social organization or individual." However, like the Supreme People's Court, the Supreme People's Procuratorate must report to the National People's Congress, the highest state body in China.

Prosecution and litigation 
The Supreme People's Procuratorate acts as a public prosecutor by handling both the investigation and prosecution of criminal cases in court, thus functioning as a civil law inquisitorial system. Such systems are also seen in Japan and socialist legal systems. Within the Procuratorate, criminal prosecution is overseen by four specialized departments that oversee “regular crimes, serious crimes, duty crimes, and new-type crimes," respectively. The agency reviews and arbitrates on which criminal suspects should be investigated and which criminal cases should be taken to a public prosecution. It may also initiate public interest litigation.

Legal supervision 

The Supreme People's Procuratorate conducts reviews of rulings and investigations performed by local and special procuratorates. Additionally, for all types of cases, the Procuratorate may protest any rulings of the lower people's courts that it deems inappropriate or flawed by lodging a formal appeal with the Supreme People's Court. For civil and administrative cases, including intellectual property cases, this intervention mainly occurs after the court has handed down a legally binding and enforceable decision. The Procuratorate may act in this manner by choice or when petitioned by a litigant involved in a given case.

Judicial interpretations 
The Procuratorate, either independently or in conjunction with the Supreme People's Court, may also issue judicial interpretations, which are official and legally binding interpretations of the law. These interpretations may serve as "replies" to individual cases, reminiscent of Roman law, or apply more broadly. Despite theoretically possessing less legal authority than the law, academics C.H. van Rhee and Yulin Fu perceive the Procuratorate's judicial interpretations as being "almost as effective as law" in court.

Supervision of the state 
Between the 1980s to the early 2010s, the Supreme People's Procuratorate investigated and prosecuted corruption and bribery through its anti-corruption departments. The Supreme People's Procuratorate also assisted the Central Commission for Discipline Inspection with the prosecution of party members relegated to a form of extralegal detention known as Shuanggui. Shuanggui is a procedure used to extract evidence and confessions from party members under investigation. Material obtained using Shuanggui was passed onto the Procuratorate and used in the prosecution of party members.

As of March 2018, the Supreme People's Procuratorate no longer performs these responsibilities. These powers have instead been assumed by the National Supervisory Commission, which campaigns against corruption in conjunction with the Central Commission for Discipline Inspection – the anti-graft agency of the Chinese Communist Party. Some academics prompted that these changes have reduced the overall power of the Procuratorate.

Organisation 

The Supreme People's Procuratorate is led by a Procuratorial Committee, which oversees the operation of the Procuratorate under the direction of the Prosecutor-General. The agency is further organised into ten prosecutor's offices, which each oversee a specific type of crime or litigation. Various additional departments, such as the Political Work Department, also exist within the Procuratorate, to oversee additional affairs. Several subordinate institutions are also directly affiliated with the Procuratorate.

The organisation of the Supreme People's Procuratorate is detailed below:

Executive bodies 
 Procuratorial Committee of the Supreme People's Procuratorate

Internal departments

Subordinate institutions 

 Supreme People's Procuratorate Service Center
 The Procuratorate Daily (newspaper)
 China Procuratorate Publishing House
 Procuratorate Technology Information Research Center
 Procuratorate Theory Research Institute
 State Procurators College

Members

Prosecutor-General 
The Supreme People's Procuratorate is led by a Prosecutor-General, who serves as the Chief Grand Prosecutor and President of the Procuratorate. The office of the Prosecutor-General serves a five-year term, corresponding with the term length of the National People's Congress. Each Prosecutor-General may serve a maximum of two terms.

The Prosecutor-General of the Supreme People's Procuratorate is elected by the National People's Congress, in accordance with the Procurators Law of the People's Republic of China. The National People's Congress also carries the executive ability to remove a serving Prosecutor-General from power. The current serving Prosecutor-General of the Supreme People's Procuratorate is Zhang Jun. Zhang was elected to the position of Prosecutor-General in March 2018 at the first session of the 13th National People's Congress.

Other members of the Procuratorate 
In addition to the Prosecutor-General, the Supreme People's Procuratorate is also composed of multiple Deputy Prosecutors-General, members of the Procuratorial Committee and additional procurators. All other members of the Procuratorate are appointed by the Standing Committee of the National People's Congress at the Prosecutor-General's recommendation. Likewise, members may be removed from the Procuratorate at the will of the People's Congress and the Prosecutor-General. The current Deputy Prosecutors-General of the Supreme People's Procuratorate are Tong Jianming, Sun Qian, Zhang Xueqiao, Chen Guoqing and Yang Chunlei.

List of Prosecutors-General 
Prosecutor-General of the Supreme People's Prosecutor's Office of the Central People's Government
 Luo Ronghuan, October 1949 – October 1954
Prosecutor-General of the Supreme People's Procuratorate of the People's Republic of China
Zhang Dingcheng, 25 September 1954 – 21 January 1976
 Huang Huoqing, 21 March 1978 – 23 March 1983
 Yang Yichen, 23 March 1983 – 31 March 1988
 Liu Fuzhi, 2 April 1988 – 14 March 1993
 Zhang Siqing, 14 March 1993 – 15 March 1998
 Han Zhubin, 15 March 1998 – 19 September 2004
 Jia Chunwang, 19 September 2004 – 16 March 2008
 Cao Jianming, 16 March 2008 – 17 March 2018
 Zhang Jun, 17 March 2018 – 11 March 2023
 Ying Yong, since 11 March 2023

See also 
 Supreme People's Court
 Supreme Prosecutors Office
 Director of Public Prosecutions

Further reading 

 Thompson-Brusstar, Michael (2022). "Supreme Supervisors? Building the People's Procuracy, 1949–1961". China Law and Society Review.

References

External links 
 Official website of the Supreme People's Procuratorate
 A brief introduction of the SPP
 (www.12309.gov.cn) Impeaching Center of the Supreme People's Procuratorate 
 https://web.archive.org/web/20131202224912/http://www.chinafulblog.com/blog/2012/10/18/chinese-government-101-supreme-peoples-procuracy.html

Chinese law
Government of China
Prosecution
1954 establishments in China
Government agencies established in 1954